Scopula emutaria, the rosy wave, is a species of moth in the family Geometridae. It is found in western and south-western Europe and Romania. Also in North Africa.

Easy to distinguish by its whitish ground-colour, slight or rather strong pink flush. Most striking is the straight broad line over the wing towards the wing tip.

Adults are on wing from June to July.

It is a coastal species. The larvae feed on sea beet and Armeria maritima.

Subspecies
Scopula emutaria emutaria
Scopula emutaria subroseata (Haworth, 1809)

References

External links

Lepiforum.de

Moths described in 1809
emutaria
Moths of Europe
Moths of Africa
Taxa named by Jacob Hübner